In mathematics, the secondary measure associated with a measure of positive density ρ when there is one, is a measure of positive density μ, turning the secondary polynomials associated with the orthogonal polynomials for ρ into an orthogonal system.

Introduction
Under certain assumptions that we will specify further, it is possible to obtain the existence of  a secondary measure and even to express it. 

For example, if one works in the Hilbert space L2([0, 1], R, ρ)

 

with

 

in the general case, or:

 

when ρ satisfies a Lipschitz condition.

This application φ is called the reducer of ρ.

More generally, μ et ρ are linked by their Stieltjes transformation with the following formula:

 

in which c1 is the moment of order 1 of the measure ρ.

These secondary measures, and the theory around them, lead to some surprising results, and make it possible to find in an elegant way quite a few traditional formulas of analysis, mainly around the Euler Gamma function, Riemann Zeta function, and Euler's constant.

They also allowed the clarification of integrals and series with a tremendous effectiveness, though it is a priori difficult.

Finally they make it possible to solve integral equations of the form 

 

where g is the unknown function, and lead to theorems of convergence towards the Chebyshev and Dirac measures.

The broad outlines of the theory

Let ρ be a measure of positive density on an interval I and admitting moments of any order. We can build a family {Pn} of orthogonal polynomials for the inner product induced by ρ.  Let us call {Qn} the sequence of the secondary polynomials associated with the family P.  Under certain conditions there is a measure for which the family Q is orthogonal. This measure, which we can clarify from ρ is called a secondary measure associated initial measure ρ.

When ρ is a probability density function, a sufficient condition so that μ, while admitting moments of any order can be a secondary measure associated with ρ is that its Stieltjes Transformation is given by an equality of the type: 

 

a is an arbitrary constant and c1 indicating the moment of order 1 of ρ.

For a = 1 we obtain the measure known as secondary,  remarkable since for n ≥ 1 the norm of the polynomial Pn for ρ coincides exactly with the norm of the secondary polynomial associated Qn when using the measure μ.

In this paramount case, and if the space generated by the orthogonal polynomials is dense in L2(I, R, ρ), the operator Tρ defined by 

 

creating the secondary polynomials can be furthered to a linear map connecting space L2(I, R, ρ) to L2(I, R, μ) and becomes isometric if limited to the hyperplane Hρ of the orthogonal functions with P0 = 1.

For unspecified functions square integrable for ρ we obtain the more general formula of covariance:

 

The theory continues by introducing the concept of reducible measure, meaning that the quotient ρ/μ is element of L2(I, R, μ). The following results are then established:

The reducer φ of ρ is an antecedent of ρ/μ for the operator Tρ. (In fact the only antecedent which belongs to Hρ).

For any function square integrable for ρ, there is an equality known as the reducing formula: 

.

The operator 

 

defined on the polynomials is prolonged in an isometry Sρ linking the closure of the space of these polynomials in L2(I, R, ρ2μ−1)  to the hyperplane Hρ provided with the norm induced by ρ.

Under certain restrictive conditions the operator Sρ acts like the adjoint of Tρ for the inner product induced by ρ.

Finally the two operators are also connected, provided the images in question are defined, by the fundamental formula of composition:

Case of the Lebesgue measure and some other examples
The Lebesgue measure on the standard interval [0, 1] is obtained by taking the constant density ρ(x) = 1.

The associated orthogonal polynomials are called Legendre polynomials and can be clarified by 

 

The norm of Pn is worth 

 

The recurrence relation in three terms is written:

 

The reducer of this measure of Lebesgue is given by 

The associated secondary measure is then clarified as 

.

If we normalize the polynomials of Legendre, the coefficients of Fourier of the reducer φ related to this orthonormal system are null for an even index and are given by 

 

for an odd index n.

The Laguerre polynomials are linked to the density ρ(x) = e−x on the interval I = [0, ∞). They are clarified by

 

and are normalized.

The reducer associated is defined by

 

The  coefficients of Fourier of the reducer φ related to the Laguerre polynomials are given by  

 

This coefficient Cn(φ) is no other than the opposite of the sum of the elements of the line of index n in the table of the harmonic triangular numbers of Leibniz. 

The Hermite polynomials are linked to the Gaussian density

  

on I = R.

They are clarified by

 

and are normalized.

The reducer associated is defined by

 

The coefficients of Fourier of the reducer φ related to the system of Hermite polynomials are null for an even index and are given by

 

for an odd index n.

The Chebyshev measure of the second form.  This is defined by the density 

 

on the interval [0, 1].

It is the only one which coincides with its secondary measure normalised on this standard interval. Under certain conditions it occurs as the limit of the sequence of normalized secondary measures of a given density.

Examples of non-reducible measures

Jacobi measure on (0, 1) of density 

 

Chebyshev measure on (−1, 1) of the first form of density

Sequence of secondary measures
The secondary measure μ associated with a probability density function ρ has its moment of order 0 given by the formula 

 

where c1 and c2 indicating the respective moments of order 1 and 2 of ρ. 

To be able to iterate the process then, one 'normalizes' μ while defining ρ1 = μ/d0 which becomes in its turn a density of probability called naturally the normalised secondary measure associated with ρ.

We can then create from ρ1 a secondary normalised measure ρ2, then defining ρ3 from ρ2 and so on. We can therefore see a sequence of successive secondary measures, created from ρ0 = ρ, is such that ρn+1 that is the secondary normalised measure deduced from ρn

It is possible to clarify the density ρn by using the orthogonal polynomials Pn for ρ, the secondary polynomials Qn and the reducer associated φ. That gives the formula

 

The coefficient  is easily obtained starting from the leading coefficients of the polynomials Pn−1 and Pn. We can also clarify the reducer φn associated with ρn, as well as the orthogonal polynomials corresponding to ρn.

A very beautiful result relates the evolution of these densities when the index tends towards the infinite and the support of the measure is the standard interval [0, 1]. 

Let 
 
be the classic recurrence relation in three terms. If  

 

then the sequence {ρn} converges completely towards the Chebyshev density of the second form 

.

These conditions about limits are checked by a very broad class of traditional densities.
A derivation of the sequence of secondary measures and convergence can be found in

Equinormal measures
One calls two measures thus leading to the same normalised secondary density. It is remarkable that the elements of a given class and having the same moment of order 1 are connected by a homotopy. More precisely, if the density function ρ has its moment of order 1 equal to c1, then these densities equinormal with ρ are given by a formula of the type:  

 

t describing an interval containing ]0, 1].

If μ is the secondary measure of ρ, that of ρt will be tμ.

The reducer of ρt is

 

by noting G(x) the reducer of μ.

Orthogonal polynomials for the measure ρt are clarified from n = 1 by the formula

  

with Qn secondary polynomial associated with Pn.

It is remarkable also that, within the meaning of distributions, the limit when t tends towards 0 per higher value of ρt is the Dirac measure concentrated at c1. 

For example, the equinormal densities with the Chebyshev measure of the second form are defined by: 

with t describing ]0, 2]. The value t = 2  gives the Chebyshev measure of the first form.

A few beautiful applications
In the formulas below G is Catalan's constant, γ is the Euler's constant, β2n is the Bernoulli number of order 2n, H2n+1 is the harmonic number of order 2n+1 and Ei is the Exponential integral function.

 
 
 

If the measure ρ is reducible and let φ be the associated reducer, one has the equality

 

If the measure ρ is reducible with μ the associated reducer, then if f is square integrable for μ, and if g is square integrable for ρ and is orthogonal with P0 = 1 one has equivalence:

c1 indicates the moment of order 1 of ρ and Tρ the operator

In addition, the sequence of secondary measures has applications in Quantum Mechanics. The sequence gives rise to the so-called sequence of residual spectral densities for specialized Pauli-Fierz Hamiltonians. This also provides a physical interpretation for the sequence of secondary measures.

See also

Orthogonal polynomials
Probability

References

External links
 personal page of Roland Groux about the theory of secondary measures

Measures (measure theory)